MICOM Film and TV Productions was a television production company established in 1989 by Sreco Mihelcic in Slovenia. MICOM was in the 1990s the leading Slovenian creative house, producing TV shows for youth, as well as programs for popular entertainment TV shows. MICOM also gave different artists their first chance on television.

MICOM's most popular TV shows were: Lahkih nog Naokrog (an educational youth TV series), Cari Zacimb (a cooking series), and Razpoke v Casu (a Fantasy television series). It also produced documentary movies. One, Fight for the River, was distributed by internationally by International Historic Films in 1996.

MICOM produced around 30,000 minutes of programming for National TV Slovenia and other media. In 2002, the company stopped producing due to a tragedy in its owners' family.

References

External links
 https://www.youtube.com/watch?v=kzfn-PjnDNY
 Fight for the river – Documentary (trailer)
 Vasja Mihelcic – IMDb
 http://www.inbetweenmedia.de/

Film production companies of Slovenia
Slovenian companies established in 1989
Television companies of Slovenia
Companies disestablished in 2002